Alexander Stewart (died 1915) was a Scottish minister, who was principal of  St Andrews University.  He was Moderator of the General Assembly of the Church of Scotland in 1911.

Life

He was born in Liverpool.

He was professor of divinity at St Andrews University. Following the death of James Donaldson (classical scholar) in March 1915 Stewart was made principal of the university.

Following a brief illness he died on 21 July 1915 having served only a few months in the role of principal. He is buried in the burial grounds of St Andrews Cathedral. The grave lies to the north-east of St Rule's Tower in the centre of the graveyard.

Family
He was married to Isabella Meston (died 1907).

References

1915 deaths
19th-century Ministers of the Church of Scotland
Moderators of the General Assembly of the Church of Scotland
Academics of the University of St Andrews
20th-century Ministers of the Church of Scotland